Donald Allan McLean (27 January 1907 – 5 November 1973) was a Liberal party member of the Senate of Canada. He was born in Inverness, Nova Scotia and became a corporate executive.

He was appointed to the Senate for Charlotte County, New Brunswick division on 15 March 1968 following nomination by Lester B. Pearson. He remained in that role until his death on 5 November 1973.

External links
 

1907 births
1973 deaths
20th-century Canadian businesspeople
Canadian senators from New Brunswick
Liberal Party of Canada senators